"Valentine's Day" is the sixteenth episode of the second season of the American comedy television series The Office, and the show's twenty-second episode overall. Written by Michael Schur and directed by Greg Daniels, the episode first aired in the United States on February 9, 2006 on NBC. The episode guest stars Craig Anton, Andy Buckley, Charles Esten, and Conan O'Brien as himself.

The series depicts the everyday lives of office employees in the Scranton, Pennsylvania branch of the fictional Dunder Mifflin Paper Company. In this episode, Michael Scott (Steve Carell) travels to New York City to give a presentation, but accidentally tells everyone that he "hooked up" with Jan Levinson (Melora Hardin). Meanwhile, the rest of the office is jealous when Phyllis Lapin's (Phyllis Smith) boyfriend Bob Vance gives her several gifts. Also, Angela Martin (Angela Kinsey) gives Dwight Schrute (Rainn Wilson) a bobblehead model of himself.

The episode was the first time that Pam Beesly (Fischer) had a different hairstyle. In addition, many of the scenes were improvised, including Dwight's line about ham and Michael's antics in New York. "Valentine's Day" received mostly positive reviews from television critics and was watched by 8.95 million viewers.

Plot
Before a Valentine's Day meeting at the corporate offices in New York City with Jan Levinson (Melora Hardin) and the new CFO David Wallace (Andy Buckley), Michael Scott (Steve Carell), defending Jan to the other branch managers, lets slip that he and Jan "hooked up". At the meeting, Michael shows a sentimental video about the staff at his branch called "The Faces of Scranton" before providing data on the financial status of his branch as asked. Craig (Craig Anton), from the Albany branch, is completely unprepared for the meeting and attempts to cover for it by insinuating that Jan is giving Michael preferential treatment because of the supposed sexual encounter between them. Due to Wallace hearing this accusation, Jan is convinced that her career is over. Michael defuses the situation by telling the CFO that it was a bad joke and Jan is innocent of any unethical behavior. As Michael leaves, Jan kisses him in the elevator, but groans when she realizes they were caught on camera.

Back in the office, Angela Martin (Angela Kinsey) gives Dwight Schrute (Rainn Wilson) a "Dwight" bobblehead doll, and he gives her a key to his home. Phyllis Lapin (Phyllis Smith) is inundated with gifts from her boyfriend Bob Vance (Robert R. Shafer), while Pam Beesly is irritated with Roy Anderson (David Denman) when the only thing he gives her for Valentine's Day is the promise of the "best sex of [her] life". Jim Halpert (John Krasinski) is forced to listen to Kelly Kapoor (Mindy Kaling) talk about her recent date with Ryan Howard (B. J. Novak), who immediately regrets the entire encounter because it happened the day before Valentine's Day. He then turns down Kelly for another date on Valentine's Day. At the end of the day, Jim tells Pam "Happy Valentine's Day" and she watches him longingly as he leaves.

Production
This episode was the fourth episode of the series directed by series creator Greg Daniels. Daniels had previously directed the first season episode "Basketball", along with the second season episodes "The Dundies" and "The Client". "Valentine's Day" was written by Michael Schur, who plays Dwight's Amish cousin Mose. In the DVD commentary for this episode, Greg Daniels described how some of Michael's actions in this episode, such as having the requested branch info, unlike Craig, and saving Jan's job by deflecting Craig's comments when talking to David Wallace, were scripted to show how he plausibly remains employed.

For the first time ever on The Office, Pam Beesly's (Jenna Fischer) hair is in a different style. Several hairstyles were shown to Greg Daniels before the one used in the episode was selected. Dwight's line about a ham being a romantic gift was written during filming on the set. The writers did not have a punchline in the scene, so they came up with several alternatives, including ham, as well as "a boombox". Most of the street scenes in New York City were improvised. They had to be kept short because crowds quickly formed around Steve Carell when he was recognized. Conan O'Brien appeared in a cameo in the episode. He previously worked with Daniels on the writing staffs for Not Necessarily the News, Saturday Night Live and The Simpsons and the two also went to Harvard University together.

The Season Two DVD contains a number of deleted scenes from this episode. Notable cut scenes include Michael handing out plastic roses, Michael choosing the most attractive part of a woman, Creed calling everybody "Ace", Michael meeting Devon in New York, the Vance Refrigeration employees getting into a fistfight, Michael wondering why his meeting is on Valentine's Day, Jim learning that Dwight has a girlfriend, and Kevin learning that his fiancée has returned to town.

Cultural references
Michael notes that New York is the "city so nice they named it twice". He then proceeds to explain that the other name is Manhattan, failing to realize the limerick refers to the city of New York, which also lies in the state of New York. Later, he eats pizza at a Sbarro restaurant, a chain restaurant, but calls it his "favorite New York pizza joint". At Rockefeller Center, Michael thinks he sees Tina Fey, but it turns out to be a random person. Unbeknownst to Michael, Conan O'Brien walks past him. Near the end of the episode, Michael is posing in front of a Broadway sign for Fiddler on the Roof, and he says "Oy, vey! Schmear!" in a Yiddish accent. Michael's "Faces of Scranton" video plays over "With or Without You" by the Irish rock band U2. Michael later quotes a line from the 1980 comedy film Airplane! when he talks to Jan: "Don't call me Shirley".

When preparing to enter the Dunder Mifflin office for his presentation, Michael is seen sitting by the fountain in front of the tower at 1251 Sixth Avenue, directly across the street from Rockefeller Center. He gets up and walks toward the street, then is seen speaking to the camera in the lobby of the Simon & Schuster building at 1230 6th Avenue, indicating that Dunder Mifflin corporate has offices in that building.

Reception
"Valentine's Day" originally aired on NBC in the United States on February 9, 2006. The episode was viewed by 8.95 million viewers. This marked a dramatic improvement from the previous episode "Boys and Girls", which was viewed by only 5.42 million viewers.

"Valentine's Day" received mostly positive reviews. Michael Sciannamea of TV Squad wrote that "The Office continues to deliver outstanding episodes week after week." Sciannamea went on to say that the episode was "one of their best" and that it left him "wanting more". "M. Giant" of Television Without Pity graded the episode with a "A". Brendan Babish of DVD Verdict was pleased with the entry and awarded it an "A−". He named the highlight of the episode "Michael's overwrought 'The Faces of Scranton' presentation played over U2's 'With or Without You.'" Betsy Bozdech of DVD Journal called the episode "memorable" and noted that it illustrated Pam and Jim's relationship ebb and flow. Francis RizzoIII of DVD Talk declared that Ryan's statement about beginning to date Kelly before Valentine's Day was "one of the funniest lines in the entire season."

After the episode, fans wanted their own bobblehead dolls of Dwight. A petition was started to get NBC to sell them at their online store. NBC responded by creating an initial run of 4,000 bobblehead dolls, which sold out almost immediately. The network decided to make more, and since then, the bobblehead has become the best-selling merchandise on the NBC website, and has sold over 150,000 units.

References

External links
"Valentine's Day at NBC.com

2006 American television episodes
Television episodes set in New York City
The Office (American season 2) episodes
Valentine's Day television episodes
Television episodes written by Michael Schur